Ford & Woodlawn is a bus rapid transit station on the Metro A Line in Saint Paul, Minnesota.

The station is located at the intersection of Woodlawn Avenue on Ford Parkway. Both station platforms are located east of Woodlawn Avenue. The station is situated directly north of the former Twin Cities Assembly Plant, 135 acres of land that will be redeveloped into a mixed-use neighborhood by the City of Saint Paul and Ryan Companies.

The station opened June 11, 2016 with the rest of the A Line.

Bus connections
 Route 23 - Uptown - 38th Street - Highland Village
 Route 46 - 50th Street - 46th Street - 46th Street Station - Highland Village
 Route 74 - 46th Street Station - Randolph Avenue - West 7th Street - East 7th Street - Sunray Transit Center
Connections to local bus Routes 23, 46, and 74 can be made on Ford Parkway.

Notable places nearby
Ford Site
Great River Road
Intercity Bridge
Keystone Senior Living
Mississippi National River and Recreation Area
Highland Park, Saint Paul

References

External links 
 Metro Transit: Ford & Woodlawn Station

Bus stations in Minnesota
2016 establishments in Minnesota